"New Slaves" is a song by American hip hop recording artist Kanye West, from his sixth studio album Yeezus (2013). It was produced primarily by West, with additional production by Ben Bronfman, Mike Dean, Travis Scott, Noah Goldstein, Sham Joseph, and Che Pope. The song's lyrics discuss slavery and segregation, as well as racism in general, materialism, and stereotypes of African Americans in the United States. It features vocals from American recording artist Frank Ocean, whom West previously collaborated with on Watch the Throne (2011). The song's coda features a sample of "Gyöngyhajú lány" by Hungarian composer Gábor Presser, who later sued West in 2016 over its use.

Before its release on the album, West promoted it extensively, projecting it on over 60 locations around the world, and performing it live on Saturday Night Live and at the Later... With Jools Holland. Since release, the song has received widespread acclaim from music critics, with many praising its message, sample, and Ocean's appearance. Despite not being released as a single, the song charted in Canada, France, the United Kingdom, and the United States in 2013. It was nominated for Best Rap Song at the 56th Annual Grammy Awards and appeared on several year-end lists. West later performed the song on The Yeezus Tour.

Background
In a 2014 interview with Zach Baron of GQ, West claimed to have engaged in numerous meetings that included what he dubbed as "Stay in your place" type conversations. They were described as what lead him "to the point of creating 'New Slaves' and 'Blood on the Leaves' and the entire Yeezus album, and to make the album basically like a protest in music." The track samples "HBA War" by Dutch E Germ; Yeezus production consultant Arca introduced West to the track. The conclusion of "New Slaves" features Ocean singing over a sample of "Gyöngyhajú lány" (1969) by Hungarian rock band Omega.

In 2016, Hungarian composer Gábor Presser, who wrote "Gyöngyhajú lány" in 1969, claimed that West asked him for permission to use that composition as the outro of "New Slaves", and gave him a $10,000 check as a deposit toward a future agreement. The check was not cashed, and Presser filed a lawsuit against West, seeking $2.5 million. After unsuccessful negotiations between Presser and West through 2016, Judge Lewis A. Kaplan of the US Southern District of New York rejected the rapper's attempt to dismiss the suit and to transfer the case out in December. Just two days before West was slated to be deposed in the case, he reached an out-of-court deal with Presser on March 20, 2017. Details of the deal are not disclosed.

Release and promotion

"New Slaves" was released on June 18, 2013, as the fourth track on West's sixth studio album Yeezus. Prior to the song's release, it was played at 66 locations whilst a black-and-white video of West performing it was projected on various buildings in various countries around the world, including at Wrigley Field and the Royal Ontario Museum. Miriam Coleman said the simplicity of the video "provided a striking context for the rapper's searing lyrics on race and materialism". Two projections in Texas (including the Rothko Chapel) were dismissed by police prior to commencing due to a lack of permit. Another projection at Miami Beach, Florida was shut down by police, but left fans excited and eager to see the song's then-upcoming performance on Saturday Night Live.

West performed "New Slaves", along with "Black Skinhead", on Saturday Night Live on May 18, 2013. During the performance, West stood in place and stared dead-eyed at the camera the whole time, performing "in front of a projection of eyes." West also changed his lyrics to more TV-friendly, changing words such as "dick" to "prick." West subsequently performed the song live at the Governors Ball Music Festival on June 9, 2013. During the performance, West "paused and breathed audibly between scant verses, allowing interludes of emptiness to add to the corrosive aura."

Critical reception
"New Slaves" has received widespread acclaim from music critics, with its message, sample, and Ocean's appearance receiving praise. Farber of the Daily News said the song has a "heavy metal girth that still swings" and called the sampling of "Gyöngyhajú lány" by Omega "the most cool, and obscure, sample" on Yeezus. Robert Christgau of MSN Music cited "New Slaves", along with "Hold My Liquor", as the album's highlights. Michael Madden of Consequence of Sound writes: "'New Slaves' has one of the clearer concepts on the whole album, about the relationship West sees between blacks of different classes and consumerism," calling upon the lyrics: "You see it's broke-nigga racism, that's that Don't touch anything in the store'/ And this rich-nigga racism, that's that Come in, please buy more." Madden ultimately called "New Slaves" one of the album's "essential tracks," along with "Black Skinhead", "Blood on the Leaves", and "Bound 2". Evan Rytlewski of The A.V. Club called the song "menacing" and praised its coda with Frank Ocean.

West himself has voiced his love for the song, tweeting that the second verse is the best rap verse of all time in July 2013, and reiterating his opinion in a 2014 interview with GQ magazine.

Accolades
On June 26, 2013, Time named "New Slaves" the "Best Song of 2013 (So Far)" and later on December 20, 2013, placed it first on its "The 25 Best Songs of 2013 (The Entire Year)." On December 2, 2013, Complex named "New Slaves" the best song of 2013. Dave Bry commented saying, "Plenty of artists sold more records than Kanye West in 2013. No one did anything near to as artistically powerful. "New Slaves" is the best song of the year. And it's not even close." NME ranked the song at number 36 on their list of the 50 best songs of 2013. It was named the second best song of 2013 by Pitchfork. They elaborated saying, ""New Slaves" is the hardened cartilage of Yeezus, the leanest and grisliest piece of music on an album without a single yielding surface. There isn't a wasted breath or unnecessary word; every single thought cleaves through the meat. [...] Yes, Kanye is a wealthy man, and yes, the particulars of his rage might be convoluted, involving his lack of access to the upper reaches of the fashion industry. But its source comes from an acute, unwavering awareness of a central fact: Even in the elite corridors of power where he now walks, some doors are still locked. On "New Slaves", he transforms into the hordes demanding entry. To paraphrase the words of his one-time mentor: The whole industry could hate him; he'll flail his way through."

The song earned a Grammy nomination for Best Rap Song at the 56th Annual Grammy Awards, ultimately losing to "Thrift Shop" by Macklemore & Ryan Lewis featuring Wanz.

Live performances

Before its release on the album, West performed "New Slaves", along with "Black Skinhead", on Saturday Night Live on May 18, 2013. The performance introduced audiences to West's new creative shift for Yeezus and showed how musically different the album would be from his previous, My Beautiful Dark Twisted Fantasy (2010). West performed the song again at the Governors Ball Music Festival on June 9, 2013, nine days before the release of the album. Following the release of Yeezus, West performed the song live at the first concert of The Yeezus Tour at the Barclays Center in New York City. West wore a jeweled mask during the show, which Jim Farber of New York Daily News believed contributed to "the industrial fusion he has injected on Yeezus." When commenting on his performance of "New Slaves" and "Black Skinhead", Farber writes: "West delivers [them] with the brutality they deserve." In September 2013, West performed an acoustic rendition of the song with Charlie Wilson on Later... with Jools Holland.

Credits and personnel
Credits adapted from the Yeezus liner notes.

 Songwriter – Kanye West, Christopher Breaux, Cydel Young, Ben Bronfman, Malik Jones, Che Smith, Elon Rutberg, Sakiya Sandifer, Louis Johnson, Mike Dean, Gábor Presser, and Anna Adamis
 Producer – Kanye West
 Co-producer – Ben Bronfman
 Additional vocals – Frank Ocean
 Additional producer – Mike Dean #MWA, Travis Scott, Noah Goldstein, Sham Joseph, and Che Pope
 Additional programming – Hudson Mohawke and Arca
 Noises and vocal sounds creator and engineer – Ken Lewis
 Engineer – Noah Goldstein, Anthony Kilhoffer, and Mike Dean
 Assistant engineer – Marc Portheau, Khoï Huynh, Raoul Le Pennec, Nabil Essemlani, Keith Parry, Kenta Yonesaka, Dave Rowland, Kevin Matela, Sean Oakley, Eric Lynn, Dave 'Squirrel' Covell, and Josh Smith
 Mix – Anthony Kilhoffer at Shangri-La Studios, Malibu, CA
 Mix assisted – Sean Oakley, Eric Lynn, Dave 'Squirrel' Covell, and Josh Smith

Chart positions

Certifications

Notes

References 

2013 songs
Frank Ocean songs
Kanye West songs
Song recordings produced by Kanye West
Song recordings produced by Mike Dean (record producer)
Song recordings produced by Travis Scott
Songs against racism and xenophobia
Songs written by Cyhi the Prynce
Songs written by Frank Ocean
Songs written by Kanye West
Songs written by Mike Dean (record producer)
Songs written by Rhymefest
Works about American slavery
Works about racism
Songs involved in plagiarism controversies